Gunnislake railway station serves the village of Gunnislake in Cornwall, England. There are also connecting buses from here to the town of Tavistock. However the station is located in or nearer to the villages of Drakewalls and Albaston.  It is the northern terminus of the Tamar Valley Line from Plymouth.

History

The  gauge East Cornwall Mineral Railway was opened from the quay at Calstock to Kelly Bray on 8 May 1872.  It was replaced by the present Plymouth, Devonport and South Western Junction Railway route across Calstock Viaduct on 2 March 1908 which saw passenger trains introduced.

Gunnislake became a terminus on 7 November 1966, the line onwards to  having closed the previous Saturday.  The original station was on the west side of the road bridge but in 1994 it was replaced by a new station on the east (Calstock) side which has allowed the low  bridge to be demolished.

Facilities
The station car park and bus interchange is situated immediately behind the platform. There are no ticket buying facilities, so passengers have to buy a ticket in advance or from the guard on the train. There is a help point, and timetable and information boards, on the platform, as well as a waiting shelter.

Services
The journey from Plymouth typically takes 45 minutes. During the summer nine trains each way operate on weekdays, eight on Saturdays and six on Sundays. Connections with main line services can be made at Plymouth.

Community Rail 
The railway from Plymouth to Gunnislake is designated as a community railway and is supported by marketing provided by the Devon and Cornwall Rail Partnership. The line is promoted as the "Tamar Valley Line".

References

Bibliography

External links
Video footage of Gunnislake station

Railway stations in Cornwall
Former Plymouth, Devonport and South Western Junction Railway stations
Railway stations in Great Britain opened in 1908
Railway stations served by Great Western Railway
1908 establishments in England
DfT Category F1 stations